DSQ Software Ltd, established in 1992 and headquartered in Chennai formerly Madras, India was a publicly listed IT and Software services consulting company mainly operated overseas using its base in India. DSQ was in the league of IT companies established and operating from India during the tech-boom of 1990s, that mainly catered demands from western markets. Company was known as Square D Software Ltd when it was incepted in 1992 and later on changed its name to DSQ Software in the year 1997.

The Company offered service offerings in Mainframe and Midrange computing, Telecommunications, CAD, and various other IT service areas. DSQ had clients in US, Europe and Asia Pacific and employed around 2000 people in the year 2000 and reported revenues in the region of $150m for the same year. Hewitt Associates, a leading US based Human Resources consultancy firm valued the human resources capital of DSQ at $1bn. DSQ had an impressive list of international clients and it posted year-on-year increasing revenues till year 2000.

Dinesh Dalmia, Company's promoter and Managing director got entangled in a series of share market controversies in relation to various dubious acquisitions and partisan allotments made by DSQ in the year 2000 & 2001. From the year 2002, DSQ's market presence diminished when its lucrative operations and client service contract agreements were sold to a privately held company. Year 2003 saw DSQ's collapse and there was very minimal business activities as the promoter was rumored to have disappeared from the scene in order to avoid legal proceedings.

Dalmia got arrested at Delhi, India in 2006 for various fraud charges. It is believed that Dalmia was in the United States from 2003 to 2006 trying to establish presence in the BPO market by setting up businesses using proxy names and deals. He was constantly seen in the New Brunswick area of New Jersey driving luxury cars and often eating at Udipi Cafe. He has been indicted in 2006 by the FBI in the United States on multiple charges of fraud. However, in the year 2011 he has been released on bail in all cases in India. There are rumors that he has also entered into a settlement in the United States.

DSQ Software is operationally dormant as per the trading information submitted for the year 2005. As per BSE data, the public holding in DSQ Software is over 70% and equity capital of over Rupees 300 million.

During Oct 2013, SEBI barred Dinesh Dalmia and DSQ Software for a period of 7 years.

References

External links 
 Sucheta Dalal :DSQ Software Saga

Software companies of India
Companies based in Chennai
Software companies established in 1992
Indian companies established in 1992
1992 establishments in Tamil Nadu
Companies listed on the National Stock Exchange of India
Companies listed on the Bombay Stock Exchange